Sankardev Nagar is a town and headquarter of newly created Hojai district in the Indian state of Assam. It was made headquarter of newly created Hojai district in 2015.

Transport

Road 
National Highway-27 pass through the town. It is 171 km away from state capital of Assam, Guwahati.

Gallery

See also 
 Hojai
 Lanka

References 

Cities and towns in Hojai district
Year of establishment missing